Strategicon is a series of gaming conventions held in Southern California, focusing on role-playing games, Board Games, card games and miniatures gaming.

There are three annual conventions under the Strategicon banner, each held on a different three-day holiday weekend and running from Friday to Monday:
 Orccon (President's Day weekend, mid-February)
 Gamex (Memorial Day weekend, late May)
 Gateway (Labor Day weekend, late August / early September)

Strategicon events are currently based out of the Hilton Los Angeles Airport Hotel

References

External links
 Strategicon homepage
 Hilton LAX Homepage

Gaming conventions
Role-playing conventions
Annual events in California